Young Lady and Gentleman is a South Korean television series starring Ji Hyun-woo, Lee Se-hee and Cha Hwa-yeon, and directed by Shin Chang-seok. The weekend drama revolves around Lee Yong-gook, a widower with three children and a live-in tutor for his kids, Park Dan-dan, to whom he becomes attracted. It premiered on KBS2 on September 25, 2021, and aired every Saturday and Sunday at 19:55 (KST) for 52 episodes till March 27, 2022.

The series won 7 awards at the 2021 KBS Drama Awards including Grand Prize (Daesang) by Ji Hyun-woo and the best couple award by him and Lee Se-hee. As per Nielsen Korea, the 48th episode aired on March 13, 2022, logged a national average viewership of 38.2% with 6.9 million viewers watching the episode. As of March 28, 2022, the series was in 3rd place among 'Top 50 series per nationwide viewers in Korea'. Viewing the popularity of the series it was extended for 2 more episodes, making it 52 episodes in total.

Synopsis
Dan Dan (Lee Se-hee) lives with her father, her stepmom and her stepbrother, Dae Bum, the ever-failing businessman, who has lost their home and all their money in a scam. Tired of putting up with them, she leaves home. Feeling down on her luck, she climbs up a mountain as a temporary relief from life's pressures. There, Dan Dan runs into and is startled by Young Guk (Ji Hyun-woo), who is hiking while dressed in a suit. Young Guk is the capable chairman of a corporation, as well as a widower with three kids. Dan Dan becomes their live-in tutor and, by chance, other members of her family also end up living at Young Guk's house. As she and Young Guk start to live together and look after Young Guk's kids, they find themselves in situations of conflict, both small and large. Despite their 14-year age difference, they start to grow fond of one another. With the help of Dan Dan, will Young Guk be able to overcome his grief and grow closer to his kids? The plot shares many significant story elements of The Sound of Music and Parasite.

Cast

Main
 Ji Hyun-woo as Lee Young-guk
41 years old, a widower, in grief due to the loss of his wife two years ago, whom he has three children with. He is the corporate chairman of FT Group (incl. Fantom) and an attractive man in his early forties. In a twist of fate, Young-guk met Dan-dan when he was in military service.
 Lee Se-hee as Park Dan-dan
 Kim Min-seo as young Park Dan-dan
27 years old, bright and bold personality, a live-in tutor of Lee Young-guk's children, a confident 'handmaiden' who seeks her own happiness. Dan-dan met Young-guk when she was 12 years old.
 Kang Eun-tak as Cha Gun
The youngest son of Jin Dal-rae, maternal uncle of Dan-dan, Dae-beom and Mi-rim.
 Park Ha-na as Jo Sa-ra
36 years old, has managed Lee Young-guk's household for five years; she has a crush on him. She is the paternal mother of  Lee Se-jong.

Supporting

People around Lee Young-guk 
 Cha Hwa-yeon as Wang Dae-ran
59 years old, Lee Se-ryun's biological mother. She is a former movie star and the stepmother of Lee Young-guk. She was Lee Ki-ja's middle-school classmate and later became the mistress to Young-guk's father at age 20.
 Yoon Jin-yi as Lee Se-ryun
36 years old, Lee Young-guk's younger half-sister, daughter of Wang Dae-ran. She falls in love with Park Dae-beom at first sight.
 Choi Myung-bin as Lee Jae-ni
14 years old, arrogant and rough eldest daughter of Lee Young-guk.
 Yoo Jun-seo as Lee Se-chan
10 years old, eldest son of Lee Young-guk, likes hip-hop and swag.
 Seo Woo-jin as Lee Se-jong
6 years old, a cute kindergartener and the (supposed) youngest son of Lee Young-guk.
 Lee Il-hwa as Anna Kim
 Kang Se-jung as Kim Ji-young (who became Anna Kim after her accident) (cameo eps. 1 and 6)
Ex-wife of Park Soo-cheol and biological mother of Park Dan-dan. 10 years ago, she met a car accident and had dozens of major surgeries, she overcame all that and moved to the United States to succeed as a designer. Her mother had been Lee Young-guk's nanny many years ago.

People around Park Dan-dan 
 Lee Jong-won as Park Soo-cheol
55 years old, husband of Cha Yeon-sil, the father of Park Dan-dan and stepfather of Park Dae-beom. He is a devoted father. Known as Kyung-Hoon as a child.
 Oh Hyun-kyung as Cha Yeon-sil
57 years old, daughter of Jin Dal-rae, wife of Park Soo-cheol, stepmother of Park Dan-dan and biological mother of Park Dae-beom. She likes drinking and dances and is full of aegyo.
 Ahn Woo-yeon as Park Dae-beom 
29 years old, elder stepbrother of Park Dan-dan, cousin of Kang Mi-rim and Lee Se-ryun's love interest.
 Kim Young-ok as Jin Dal-rae
80 years old, mother of Cha Yeon-sil and Cha Gun, grandmother of Dae-beom, Dan-dan and Mi-rim.
 Kim Yi-kyung as Kang Mi-rim 
25 years old, granddaughter of Jin Dal-rae, niece of Cha Yeon-sil and Cha Gun. Her mother is the deceased oldest daughter of Jin Dal-rae. Love interest of Bong Joon-oh.

Others 
 Lee Hwi-hyang as Lee Ki-ja
59 years old widow, Jo Sa-ra's mother, Jang Mi-sook's high school classmate and Wang Dae-ran's middle-school classmate.
 Im Ye-jin as Jang Mi-sook
59 years old widow, Fantom clothesline store owner, Jang Gook-hee's adopted older sister and Bong Joon-oh's mother.
 Yang Byung-yeol as Bong Joon-oh
Jang Mi-sook's son, a kind and faithful medical student is good-looking and sweet.
 Wang Bit-na as Jang Gook-hee
40 years old, Lee Young-guk's college alumna and longtime friend, Jang Mi-sook's adopted younger sister. She emigrates to the USA.
 Eru as Ko Jung-woo
40 years old, Lee Young-guk's college alumnus, longtime friend and lawyer.
 Kim Young-joon as Oh Kyung-seok
 Son of the director of Sa-Rang hospital. He wants to marry Lee Se-ryun for the sake of the hospital.
 Lee Tae-ri as Ma Hyun-bin
He is the senior of Park Dan-dan, who is friendly and kind. Young guk is jealous of him seeing his close relationship with Dan-dan.
 Han Jae-suk as Oh Seung-ho
A friend of Lee Se-ryun  from studying abroad. but he used to like her.
 Kim Ga-yeon as Mrs. Kim Shil-jang, housekeeper and the home maid at the home of Lee Young-Guk.
 Yoon Ji-sook as Mrs. Yeoju, a housemaid, who secretly helps Park Dan Dan.
 Jeon Seung-bin as Jin Sang-goo 
 Lee Se-jong's biological father and Jo Sa-ra's old lover.
 Oh Seung-ah as Ahn Ji-min, who has liked Lee Young Guk for long enough to be able to send emails even while studying abroad.

Special appearance 
 Lim Hye-young as Young-ae
Lee Young-guk’s deceased wife (died at the age of 37), and mother of their 3 children. Jo Sa-ra’s good friend.
 Hong Seok-cheon as Real Estate President
 Jo Eun-sook as Mi So-cheol's mistress 
 Yang Chi-seung 
He comes to see the house where Lee Ki-ja lives.
 Park Gwang-jae 
He comes to see the house where Lee Ki-ja lives.
 Moon Hee-kyung as Seung-ho's mother Ep.36-42.

Production
The writer of the series Kim Sa-Kyung returned to the KBS2 TV weekend drama after two and half years. Their last series was the 2019 weekend drama My Only One. Yoon Jin-yi, Im Ye-jin, Cha Hwa-yeon and Lee Hwi-hyang are working together after My Only One. In April 2021, Ji Hyun-woo's agency Ryan Heart and Park Hana's agency, FN Entertainment, and Cha Hwa-yeon confirmed that they were considering the offer of a role in the series. Kang Eun-tak, Park Ha-na, Ahn Woo-yeon and Yoon Jin-yi joined the cast in June 2021. On July 8, photos from the script reading site were released.

On November 16, 2021, it was reported that a confirmed case of COVID-19 caused the suspension of filming as per guidelines for the prevention of pandemic. Later, on November 17, 2021, it was reported that all the cast and crew had tested negative for COVID-19, resulting in filming and broadcasting as normal without interruption.

On December 10, 2021, it was reported that filming on December 9, 2021 had been cancelled due to COVID-19 being detected while filming, thus the filming was stopped. Later the same day, officials confirmed that the day before, "one officer tested positive for a routine corona 19 test," he said. We are running PCR tests if all results are negative, we will reschedule the filming.

On January 9, 2022, it was announced that the series will have 2 more episodes and air for 52 episodes instead of the previously announced 50 episodes.

On March 4, 2022, it was confirmed that actress Lee Se-hee tested positive for COVID-19 and thus quarantined for a week. She will not  participate in the filming of the series during her quarantine period. Oh Hyun-kyung also tested positive from a self-diagnosis kit, her PCR test result is awaited.

On March 7, 2022, it was confirmed that actors Ahn Woo-yeon and Yang Byung-yeol had contracted COVID-19. Oh Hyun-kyung was also confirmed positive, resulting in a temporary suspension of filming. On March 11, filming was resumed after self quarantine period was over for infected actors.

On March 11, 2022, it was confirmed that actresses Lee Se-hee and Oh Hyun-kyung have recovered from COVID-19 and have resumed filming.

On March 17, 2022, it was reported that the script of the finale episode no. 52 has reached the cast, and filming will end on March 22, 2022.

Release and reception
Young Lady and Gentleman began  its first broadcast on KBS2 on September 25, 2021, and aired every Saturday and Sunday at 19:55 (KST).

On March 5, 2022 musical show Immortal Songs: Singing the Legend, held a special 546th episode for Young Lady and Gentleman cast, in which Im Ye-jin, Yoo Jun-seo, Moon Hee-kyung, Lee Chan-won, Yang Byung-yeol, Kim Yi-kyung and Park Ha-na gave performances.

Audience response

As per Nielsen Korea, the 48th episode aired on March 13, 2022, logged a national average viewership of 38.2% with 6.9 million viewers watching the episode, thereby breaking its own highest ratings. As of March 28, 2022, the series was in 3rd place among the 'Top 50 series per nationwide viewers in Korea'.

According to Gallup Korea in a March survey of Koreans' Favorite TV Programs, Young Lady and Gentleman took the top spot for 5 months with 8.7% preference.

OST response

"Love Always Runs", the main OST of the series arranged by composer Midnight, with lyrics by Kang Tae-gyu and sung by Lim Young-woong won the Asia Artist Awards and Seoul Music Awards for the Best OST. In addition, it ranked first in daily, weekly, and monthly charts, and in the ballad category. Moreover as of March 27, its music video, official audio video, lyrics video, and sound source video surpassed 47 million views cumulatively.

Twitter trend

The series took first place in Twitter real-time trend for the first quarter of 2022 as announced on April 14, by Twitter. 'Twitter real-time trend is the result of analyzing and counting the Twitter real-time trend, which became a measure of topicality when tweets related to works are concentrated in real time before, during and after airing, on Twitter, creating a buzz.'

Home media

The series was made available for streaming globally on Netflix on August 19, 2022.

Original soundtrack

Part 1

Part 2

Part 3

Part 4

Part 5

Part 6

Viewership 
 Audience response

Awards and nominations

Notes

References

External links
   
 Young Lady and Gentleman at Daum 
  Young Lady and Gentleman at Naver 
 
 
 

Korean Broadcasting System television dramas
2021 South Korean television series debuts
2022 South Korean television series endings
Korean-language television shows
Television series about families
South Korean romantic comedy television series
South Korean comedy-drama television series
Television productions suspended due to the COVID-19 pandemic